Bone Dry is a 2008 American action-thriller film directed, produced by Brett A. Hart & written by Jeff O'Brien & Brett A. Hart. The film stars Luke Goss and Lance Henriksen.

Cast 
 Luke Goss as Eddie
 Lance Henriksen as Jimmy
 Tommy 'Tiny' Lister as Mitch
 Dee Wallace as Joanne (as Dee Wallace-Stone)
 Jennifer Siebel Newsom as Wife (as Jennifer Siebel)
 Carl Buffington as Marty
 Richard Larsen as Cook
 Julia Self as Connie
 Chad Stalcup as Price
 Hudson Thames as Son

Reception 
The movie received mostly positive reviews with Niall Browne of Movies in Focus giving 4 out of 5 stars which read "An expertly crafted and well acted B-movie, Bone Dry ticks all the boxes in what you want in a film like this. Brett A. Hart’s thriller will surely become a cult favourite in years to come – and that’s something which it rightfully deserves.". Shawn S. Lealos of Renegade Cinema also gave the movie a positive review citing "It is also tough when the movie was sold to a distributor who never fulfilled their promises of promotion and the movie was buried, only to find the light of day in bargain bins. It is tragic when that movie is very, very good. Bone Dry is one of those movies.". Andrew Pragasam of The Spinning Image said " For what it is, the movie is well put together. Hazy, orange visuals bleach the arid desert, while director Brett A. Hart’s inventive camerawork builds a fine sense of unease." though was a little more critical by saying "Tragically, the climactic twist isn’t bad at all and switches our allegiances in a way that doesn’t leave you feeling cheated.".

References

External links 
 

2007 films
2007 drama films
American drama films
Films shot in California
2000s English-language films
2000s American films